Bonsai is a 2011 Chilean drama film directed by Cristián Jiménez, based on the 2006 book  of the same name by Alejandro Zambra. It premiered during the Un Certain Regard section at the 2011 Cannes Film Festival. The film was released in the United Kingdom on 30 March 2012 and in the United States on 11 May 2012.

Cast
 Gabriela Arancibia as Bárbara
 Cristóbal Briceño as Hippie
 Nathalia Galgani as Emilia
 Trinidad González as Blanca
 Ingrid Isensee as Vecina
 Paola Lattus as Vendedora
 Hugo Medina as Gazmuri
 Diego Noguera as Julio
 Andrés Waas as Claudio

See also
 Cinema of Chile

References

External links
 

2011 films
2011 drama films
2010s Spanish-language films
Films about writers
Films shot in Chile
Films based on Chilean novels
Chilean drama films